The 1995/96 FIS Nordic Combined World Cup was the 13th world cup season, a combination of ski jumping and cross-country skiing organized by FIS. It started on 6 Dec 1995 in Steamboat Springs, United States and ended on 16 March 1996 in Oslo, Norway.

Calendar

Men

Standings

Overall 

Standings after 13 events.

Nations Cup 

Standings after 13 events.

References

External links
FIS Nordic Combined World Cup 1995/96 

1995 in Nordic combined
1996 in Nordic combined
FIS Nordic Combined World Cup